The 2019–20 season is AaB's 37th consecutive season in the top flight of Danish football, 30th consecutive season in the Danish Superliga, and 134th year in existence as a football club.

After AaB had played its first 24 matches of the 3F Superliga season and reached the semi-final of the Sydbank Pokalen, all Danish sports were postponed, starting from 18 March 2020, due to the COVID-19 pandemic. On 7 May 2020, the Danish government allowed professional sports taking place outdoors to return behind closed doors, thus also football. As a result of the unexpected break, the season was prolonged to include the months of June and July with two additional friendlies being played before the restart of the tournaments. AaB qualified for the club's 12th Danish Cup final.

Club

Coaching staff 

{| class="wikitable"
!Position
!Staff
|-
|Head coach|| Jacob Friis
|-
|Assistant coaches|| Allan K. Jepsen (until 24 June 2020) Lasse Stensgaard (until 24 June 2020) Thomas Augustinussen (from 24 June 2020) Rasmus Würtz (from 24 June 2020)
|-
|Development manager|| Poul Erik Andreasen (until 1 August 2019)
|-
|Head of coaching|| Søren Krogh (from 1 January 2020)
|-
|Goalkeeping coach|| Poul Buus
|-
|Analyst|| Jim Holm Larsen
|-
|Team Leader|| Ernst Damborg
|-
|Doctor|| Søren Kaalund
|-
|Physiotherapist|| Morten Skjoldager
|-
|Physical trainer|| Ashley Tootle
|-
|Mental trainer|| Rasmus Würtz
|-
|U/19 League coach|| David Olsen
|-
|U/17 League coach|| Nikolaj Hørby
|-
|U/15 League coach|| Claus Bech Jørgensen
|-

Other information 

 (until 22 October 2019) Thomas Bælum (from 22 October 2019 to 31 March 2020) Jacob Friis (from 22 October 2019 to 31 March 2020) Inge André Olsen (from 1 April 2020)

|-

Squad

First team squad 

This squad list includes any first team squad player who has been available for the line-up during the season.

Source: AaB Fodbold website

Youth players in use 

This list includes any youth player from AaB Academy who has been used in the season.

Transfers and loans

In

Summer

Winter

Out

Summer

Winter

Loan in

Loan out

Friendlies

Pre-season

Mid-season 

Notes
Note 1: The match was cancelled due to the COVID-19 pandemic.
Note 2: The match was initially scheduled for 9 February 2020, but postponed due to Storm Ciara.

Post-coronabreak

Competitions

Competition record

Superliga

Results summary

Regular season

Matches 

Notes
Note 1: Matches played behind closed doors to prevent spreading of coronavirus.
Note 2: Matches were postponed due to the COVID-19 pandemic.

Championship round

Matches 

Note 1: The capacity of Aalborg Portland Park was limited to 280 as a measure to prevent spreading of coronavirus.
Note 2: The capacity of Telia Parken was limited to 500 as a measure to prevent spreading of coronavirus.
Note 3: The capacity of Ceres Park was limited to 300 as a measure to prevent spreading of coronavirus.

Danish Cup

Notes
Note 1: The match was originally scheduled for 30 October 2019, 18:00 CET, but was postponed as AaB's kit manager got stuck in traffic on his way to Køge.
Note 2: The capacity of Aalborg Portland Park was limited to 280 as a measure to prevent spreading of coronavirus.

Statistics

Appearances 

This includes all competitive matches. The list is sorted by shirt number when appearances are equal.

Goalscorers 

This includes all competitive matches. The list is sorted by shirt number when total goals are equal.

Assists 

This includes all competitive matches. The list is sorted by shirt number when total assists are equal.

Clean sheets 

This includes all competitive matches. The list is sorted by shirt number when total clean sheets are equal.

Disciplinary record 

This includes all competitive matches. The list is sorted by shirt number when total cards are equal.

Suspensions 

This includes all competitive matches. The list is sorted by shirt number when total matches suspended are equal.

Awards

Team

Individual

References 

2019-20
Danish football clubs 2019–20 season